The 2010 Philippine House of Representatives elections were held on May 10, 2010, to elect members to the House of Representatives of the Philippines to serve in the 15th Congress of the Philippines from June 30, 2010, to June 30, 2013. The Philippines uses parallel voting for seats in the House of Representatives; a voter has two votes: one for a representative from one's legislative district, and another for a sectoral representative via closed lists under the party-list system, with a 2% election threshold and 3-seat cap, when the parties with 2% of the national vote or more not meeting the 20% of the total seats, parties with less than 2% of the vote will get one seat each until the 20% requirement is met.

In district elections, 229 single-member districts elect one member of the House of Representatives. The candidate with the highest number of votes wins that district's seat. In the party-list election, parties will dispute 57 seats. In all, the 15th Congress will have 286 members, with 144 votes being the majority. No party entered candidates in all districts, but only Lakas Kampi CMD entered enough candidates to win an outright majority.

By May 21, GMA News and Public Affairs, based on their partial and unofficial tally, had Lakas Kampi CMD with the party with the most seats with 109, followed by the Liberal Party with 43, the Nationalist People's Coalition had 33, and the Nacionalista Party had 25. The other parties garnered 13 seats. This includes candidates who switched parties after the campaign period has begun, while excluding party-list representatives.

In the party-list election, Ako Bicol Political Party topped the election getting 5% of the national vote and won three seats, but their proclamation was delayed as a disqualification case against them was brought up; their first three nominees were subsequently seated with the dismissal of the case. As much as 43 other parties qualified to win seats, and all but two were yet to be seated due to pending disqualification cases.

Despite being the party leader and winning a congressional seat in Pampanga, Lakas Kampi CMD leader and sitting president Gloria Macapagal Arroyo had reportedly declined to run as Speaker and is fielding Edcel Lagman of Albay on the basis of term–sharing with Danilo Suarez of Quezon if they win the speakership. Meanwhile, the Liberals will be fielding in former Speaker Feliciano Belmonte Jr. of Quezon City, who was also a former Lakas Kampi member. Incumbent Speaker Prospero Nograles is barred from seeking office in the House after serving three consecutive terms; he was defeated in the Davao City mayoralty election, although his son successfully kept his father's seat.

Notable celebrities who won include Imelda Marcos (KBL, Ilocos Norte–2nd), Lani Mercado (Lakas Kampi, Cavite–2nd), Lucy Torres (Liberal, Leyte–4th) and Manny Pacquiao (PCM, Saranggani).

With the Liberals, Nacionalistas, the NPC, a faction of Lakas-Kampi, other minor parties and most of the party-list groups voting for him, Belmonte was easily elected as Speaker, with 227 votes, as compared to 29 votes of Lagman.

Redistricting 
There are several new districts; most notable is the redistricting of Cavite from three legislative districts to seven. Only the old first district remained intact, except for Bacoor being separated and being named as the new second district; all other districts were redistricted anew.

The election in the Dinagat Islands is in limbo as the Supreme Court earlier ruled that the Dinagat Islands' creation as a province from Surigao del Norte was unconstitutional for not having met the provisions of the constitution on population and land area. However, the court's decision has yet to be final pending motions for reconsideration, and the commission allowed the elections to take place. If the Supreme Court finalizes its decision on the dissolution of the Dinagat Islands, the provincial-level and congressional elections held in both areas, and in the areas they were originally carved from will be voided and new elections will take place. (This will be for Surigao del Norte's province-level positions, and the first congressional district of the province. City and municipal-level elections and the 2nd district congressional election will not be affected.) If the decision is upheld, there will be 58 sectoral representatives.

Malolos, which was supposed to have its own congressional district from Bulacan's 1st district, but it was nullified with finality by the Supreme Court for having insufficient population. However, the ballots for both Malolos and the 1st district excluding Malolos were printed after the decision was finalized. As such, the elections for representative in Malolos and the 1st district were deferred, and voting done on May 10 was invalidated, and an election will be scheduled solely for the representative's position (all positions elected were upheld, with Malolos' first eight councilor candidates winning seats in the City Council, as opposed to the ten originally provided in the enabling law).

Retiring and term-limited incumbents 

As of now, there are 68 Representatives that are either term-limited or retiring from Congress.

Campaign 

Campaigns in House of Representatives elections are usually conducted on a district-by-district basis; there is no nationwide campaign. The races are between local politicians in the districts, and their allegiances and parties may switch from their announcement on the intention to run, registering as a candidate, printing out of ballots, election day and from the convening of the 15th Congress. The sitting president's party usually controls the House of Representatives no matter the election result.

The Lakas-Kampi titular head, President Arroyo, became the first president to run for a seat in the House of Representatives after her term as president; the party had the most number of candidates, and was the only party that can win an outright majority as the other parties did not run in a majority of the seats. Lakas-Kampi aimed to secure enough votes to impeach (96) as leverage if their presidential candidate Gilberto Teodoro does not win.

The Liberal Party chose former Lakas-Kampi stalwart and Quezon City mayor Feliciano Belmonte Jr. as their candidate for the speakership. Belmonte, a former speaker while being a member of Lakas-CMD (one of the two parties that formed Lakas-Kampi), defected to the Liberals before the election. The Nacionalista Party would also field a candidate for the speakership. The Nationalist People's Coalition usually supports the policies of the sitting president, while the sectoral representatives, except for those leaning to the left, also support whoever is in power. The other parties that fielded candidates on the presidential election would support their own presidential candidate, but it is unknown if they would've supported the party of the winning president; these parties fielded candidates in a minority of seats.

Notable races

Ilocos Region 

 Ilocos Norte–1st: Incumbent Roque Ablan Jr. is ineligible for reelection after serving three consecutive terms. His son, Kristian Ablan is running against former Representative Rodolfo Fariñas. Fariñas is running under the Nacionalista Party and is backed by the Marcos clan. Fariñas won with just over 50% of the vote.
 Ilocos Norte–2nd: Former First Lady Imelda Marcos is running for Congress once again this time in her son's seat. Incumbent Bongbong Marcos is retiring and running for the Senate. Imelda was formerly the representative for the 1st District of Leyte from 1995 to 1998. Marcos won with 80% of the vote.
 Pangasinan–1st: Arthur Celeste is not seeking reelection. As such, six candidates are vying the open seat. The main candidates are Arthur's brother Jesus running under the Lakas-Kampi-CMD and former GMA Network investigative journalist and reporter Maki Pulido running under the Pwersa ng Masang Pilipino. Celeste beat Pulido by around 25,000 votes while failing to win via majority.
 Pangasinan–2nd: Liberal incumbent Victor Agbayani is running for Governor of Pangasinan. The Liberals are fielding Arthel Caronoñgan as their nominee for the seat. Seven candidates are running for the open seat. Former Citizen's Battle Against Corruption (CIBAC) party-list representative Kim Bernando–Lokin of the Nationalist People's Coalition (NPC) will face notably former Philippine National Police Director and colonel Leopoldo Bataoil of the Lakas-Kampi-CMD. Bataoil, despite having 36,000-vote lead against Lokin, only got 39% of the vote.
 Pangasinan–4th: Former House Speaker Jose de Venecia Jr. has served for three consecutive terms, and is thus ineligible for re-election; his wife Gina de Venecia will run for his seat in the fourth district under the Nationalist People's Coalition (NPC). She will face two independent candidates namely Alejandro Dacano and Celia Lim. De Venecia won with just under two-thirds of the votes cast.

Cordillera Administrative Region 

 Ifugao: Governor Teodoro Baguilat Jr. is not seeking reelection. Instead, he will run for the open congressional seat of the province. He will face six other contenders in the election. Baguilat won with 28% of the votes cast.

Central Luzon 

 Bulacan–1st: After being seated by the COMELEC after successfully challenging the result of the 2007 gubernatorial election, Roberto Pagdanganan aims to win a seat in Congress against incumbent Ma. Victoria Sy-Alvarado. After several delays, due to the re-addition of Malolos into the district after the creation of its own at-large district unconstitutional, the election was held on November 13, with Sy-Alvarado winning with 69% of the vote.
 Pampanga–2nd: Incumbent president Gloria Macapagal Arroyo is aiming to be the first president to be elected to a lower office after her presidential tenure. President Arroyo won with 84% of the vote.

Metro Manila 

 Malabon: Josephine Lacson-Noel is the last representative for the Malabon-Navotas district; she was seated after the House Electoral Tribunal ruled that she won the 2007 election over Alvin Sandoval after a recount. Now she will run again for the city's first lone congressional representation under the Nationalist People's Coalition (NPC). She will face former representative and elder brother of Alvin, Federico Sandoval II of Lakas-Kampi-CMD. Sandoval run unsuccessfully for Mayor of Navotas in 2007. Sandoval finished third, behind PMP's Arnold Vicencio and Lacson-Noel who got 40% of the vote.
 Muntinlupa: Two-term Senator Rodolfo Biazon is running for a seat in the lower house against former broadcast journalist Dong Puno in a seat vacated by Biazon's son Ruffy, who is running for the Senate. Puno unsuccessfully ran for Congress in 2001, for the Senate and in 2007 for the same congressional district. They would also be facing three other candidates, namely incumbent Coun. "Lake" Espeleta, Atty. Rey Bulay and an unknown candidate. Senator Biazon won with 46% of the vote against Puno's 27%.
 Quezon City–1st:Vincent "Bingbong" Crisologo is the incumbent. He was challenged by Vivienne Tan, daughter of business tycoon Lucio Tan as an independent. Tan was disqualified on April 23, 2010, by the Court of Appeals for not being a Filipino citizen however the ruling is not yet finalized pending appeal. Crisologo won 60.78% of the vote as compared to Tan's 23.66%.
 Taguig: Incumbent Henry Duenas Jr. is not running for reelection. Those contesting the seat he is vacating are outgoing mayor Sigfrido Tiñga of the Liberal Party, and Angelito Reyes, son of Secretary of Energy Angelo Reyes, who ran against Duenas in 2007 under the local party Lingkod Taguig. Reyes was recently declared the winner of the 2007 election by the House Electoral Tribunal on February 28, 2010, with the Electoral Tribunal ruling that Reyes defeated Henry Duenas by a margin of 57 votes; the Board of Canvassers originally declared Duenas the winner with 28,564 votes over Reyes' 27,107 for a margin of 1,457. Former Mayor Sigfrido Tiñga defeated Reyes via a landslide.

Calabarzon 

 Batangas–1st: Executive Secretary Eduardo Ermita is running for Congress as her daughter, Eileen Ermita-Buhain is ineligible for reelection. Ermita resigned as Executive Secretary on February 25, 2010, after the Supreme Court ruled that all appointive officials running for office are deemed resigned. Ermita was beaten by former Bureau of Customs commissioner Tomas Apacible with a margin of nine percentage points.
 Quezon–1st: Justice Secretary Agnes Devanadera is running for Congress. Devanadera resigned as Justice Secretary on February 25, 2010, after the Supreme Court ruled appointive officials running for office are deemed resigned. She will face incumbent Wilfrido Mark Enverga of the Nacionalista Party. Enverga won the vote with 56% of the vote as against Devanadera's 42%.

Central Visayas 

 Bohol–3rd: Agriculture Secretary Arthur Yap is running unopposed in the congressional race, currently the only Cabinet member not facing opposition. About 25% invalid votes were recorded in the congressional election in the district.
 Cebu–4th: Celestino Martinez III is the pending incumbent after Benhur Salimbangon was unseated by the Supreme Court due to poll fraud. The case is under a motion for reconsideration. Martinez may not be seated until the last week of January as Congress will adjourn for election-campaigning. Martinez was not able to take his oath in the plenary as Salimbangon was able to hold on to the seat. Salimbangon won with 67% of the vote.
 Cebu City–2nd: Incumbent Antonio Cuenco is in third consecutive term already and is ineligible for reelection. He was appointed as Secretary-General of the ASEAN Inter-Parliamentary Assembly (AIPA) on February 4, 2010. Two of his three parties, Lakas-Kampi-CMD and the Probinsya Muna Development Initiative (PROMDI) did not nominate a candidate to run in this district. However, the Kugi Uswag Sugbo (Kusug) nominated businessman Jonathan Guardo as their candidate which is affiliated with the Nacionalista Party. Cebu City mayor Tomas Osmeña, who is in his third consecutive as mayor and is ineligible for reelection as mayor, is running for Congress under the Liberal Party and its affiliate Bando Osmeña – Pundok Kauswagan. Osmeña defeated Guardo by 64% to 35% of the votes cast.

Eastern Visayas 

 Leyte–4th: Actor Richard Gomez is running for Congress after being unsuccessful twice: Disqualified in 2001 as a party-list representative when Mamamayan Ayaw sa Droga was disqualified after topping the elections, and in 2007 Senate elections where he failed to win enough votes to win a seat. Gomez was disqualified by the COMELEC after failing short of the required residency requirement. He was replaced by his wife Lucy Torres-Gomez. Torres-Gomez's 56% won against Codilla's 43%.

Davao Region 

 Compostela Valley–1st: Dacer–Corbito case witness and former police superintendent Cezar Mancao is running for the open congressional seat. He is running under the Aksyon Demokratiko which in a coalition with the Liberal Party. Mancao lost the election to Maricar Apsay, daughter of the incumbent Manuel Zamora with 38% of the vote as compared to Apsay's 56%.

Soccsksargen 

 Sarangani: Boxer Manny Pacquiao is aiming to win a congressional election after being beaten in South Cotabato in 2007 by Darlene Antonino-Custodio. As such, he moved to Sarangani and is vying for its open congressional seat left by out going Rep. Erwin Chiongbian. Pacquiao is running his own People's Champ Movement which is co-endorsed by the Nacionalista Party. He will face Rep. Chiongbian's third brother, Roy Chiongbian, a local businessman. Roy is co-endorsed by the local Sarangani Reconciliation and Reformation Organization and Lakas Kampi CMD. Pacquiao won comfortably with two-thirds of votes cast.

Party-list 

Several party-list organizations were delisted, added to the list, disqualified and re-listed in the run-up to the election, most notably LGBT party Ang Ladlad which secured a Supreme Court injunction preventing COMELEC from disqualifying them. Mikey Arroyo's nomination by Ang Galing Pinoy, a party representing tricycle drivers and security guards, and other personalities of the Arroyo administration that were nominated by supposedly underrepresented sectors had also been questioned.

Defeated incumbents

Open seat gains 
 Antipolo's 2nd legislative district (Independent gain)
 Bacolod's legislative district (NPC gain)
 Basilan's legislative district (Independent gain)
 Batangas's 1st legislative district (Liberal gain)
 Batangas's 3rd legislative district (PMP gain)
 Benguet's legislative district (Liberal gain)
 Bohol's 1st legislative district (LDP gain)
 Bohol's 2nd legislative district (Nacionalista gain)
 Bukidnon's 2nd legislative district (Lakas Kampi CMD gain)
 Bulacan's 3rd legislative district (Liberal gain)
 Bulacan's 4th legislative district (Liberal gain)
 Cagayan's 3rd legislative district (Lakas Kampi CMD gain)
 Cagayan de Oro's 1st legislative district (PMP gain)
 Cebu City's 2nd legislative district (Liberal gain)
 Ilocos Norte's 1st legislative district (Nacionalista gain)
 Ilocos Norte's 2nd legislative district (KBL gain)
 Lanao del Norte's 1st legislative district (Lakas Kampi CMD gain)
 Leyte's 4th legislative district (Liberal gain)
 Marinduque's legislative district (Lakas Kampi CMD gain)
 Misamis Oriental's legislative district (PMP gain)
 North Cotabato's 2nd legislative district (Lakas Kampi CMD gain)
 Pangasinan's 4th legislative district (NPC gain)
 Parañaque's 1st legislative district (Liberal gain)
 Pateros/Taguig's legislative district (Liberal gain)
 Quezon City's 1st legislative district (Liberal gain)
 San Juan's legislative district (PMP gain)
 Sarangani's legislative district (Nacionalista gain)
 Sorsogon's 2nd legislative district (Liberal gain)
 South Cotabato's 2nd legislative district (NPC gain)
 Tarlac's 1st legislative district (NPC gain)

Results

District elections 

In district elections, the candidate with the highest number of votes in the district wins that district's seat.
Even prior to the election when Lakas Kampi CMD members switched parties to either the Liberals or the Nacionalistas, they still suffered the biggest seat losses, although they still retained the plurality of seats in the House. The Liberals and Nacionalistas all gained seats but will not surpass the number of Lakas Kampi's seats. Lakas Kampi also tallied the most votes, but had a disproportionate number of seats won (38% of the vote as compared to 45% of the district seats).

A total of seven independents won in the House.

Party-list election 

In party-list elections, parties nominate three persons to be their candidates, ranked in order of which they will be seated if elected.

Candidates from the district elections are not allowed to be nominated by the parties participating in the party-list election, nor are parties who have candidates in the district elections may be allowed to join the party-list election; the parties in the party-list election must represent a distinct "sector" in the society such as women, laborers and the like.

In the election, the voter elects the party, not the nominees of the party (closed list). If the party surpasses 2% of the national vote, the person first nominated by the party will be seated. Additional seats can be won depending on the number of votes the party garnered in the election (see the formula), although a party can only win up to three seats. If there are still empty seats, parties with less than 2% of the vote will be ranked in descending order, then will have one seat each until all of the seats have been filled up.

On May 31, the leading parties in the party-list election were declared by the commission as winners; deferred are the parties (not nominees) that have pending disqualification cases against them. According to Ang Galing Pinoy's proclamation, the party of incumbent Pampanga 2nd district representative Mikey Arroyo was recalled as Arroyo has a pending disqualification notice against him, and he is their No. 1 nominee.

 Key: Italicized: incumbent representative; boldfaced: elected representative.

Details 

Shading refers to the party that won a plurality of seats:

Aftermath 

Several congressmen-elect have already defected to the Liberal Party as response to Noynoy Aquino's victory in the presidential election. This comes as Negros Occidental representative Iggy Arroyo said that Lakas Kampi CMD has the number to elect his sister-in-law and representative-elect President Gloria Macapagal Arroyo as speaker as she is pushed by to run for the speakership. Congressman-elect and former speaker Feliciano Belmonte Jr. (formerly of Lakas Kampi) has emerged to be the Liberal Party's leading candidate for speaker. The anti-Arroyo representatives have formed the Conscience and Reform (CORE) coalition to strengthen their ranks.

However, Arroyo had repeatedly declined Lakas Kampi's prodding to run for speaker. Three Lakas Kampi congressmen instead made themselves available to run for speaker: Edcel Lagman (Albay), Danilo Suarez (Quezon) and Elpidio Barzaga Jr. (Dasmariñas) in a party caucus. It was agreed upon that while Arroyo "will still call the shots," Lagman will run for the speakership, and if elected, will serve for the first 18 months, then Suarez will serve the remainder.

On June 25, the Liberal Party swore in congressmen as new members, mostly defecting from Lakas-Kampi. Most Lakas-Kampi congressmen jumpred ship after Arroyo declined being their party's candidate for speaker. With the House "tradition" in which congressmen align themselves with the party of the president, Belmonte now has at least 150 congressmen pledging support for him, including 75 from the Liberal Party, members of the Nationalist People's Coalition (NPC), Nacionalistas, PDP–Laban, party-list groups, and "some 55" members of the Lakas-Kampi independent bloc.

The House of Representatives convened on July 26, with Joseph Emilio Abaya (Cavite) nominating Belmonte for Speaker; Rodolfo Albano (Isabela), Danilo Suarez (Quezon) and Augusto Syjuco (Iloilo) nominated Lagman. Belmonte was elected Speaker with 227 votes, while Lagman got 29 votes.

*Belmonte and Lagman voted for each other.

Special elections 
 Bulacan–1st (November 13, 2010): Incumbent Ma. Victoria Sy-Alvarado won with almost 70% of the vote over Roberto Pagdanganan. Note that this is considered a part of general election, only that it was delayed for several months.
 Cagayan–2nd (March 12, 2011): Florencio Vargas of Cagayan's 2nd district died prior to the convening of Congress. A special election was held with Vargas' daughter, Baby Aline Vargas-Alfonso beating Edgar Lara.
 Ilocos Sur–1st (May 28, 2011): Ronald Singson of Ilocos Sur's 1st district resigned after being convicted of drug possession at Hong Kong. Singson's brother, Vigan vice mayor Ryan Singson beat Randy Baterina at the special election.
 Zambales–2nd (February 4, 2012): Antonio M. Diaz of Zambales's 2nd district died. Governor Hermogenes Ebdane's son Jun Omar Ebdane beat Cheryl Deloso-Montalla at the special election.
 Negros Occidental–5th (June 2, 2012): Ignacio Arroyo of Negros Occidental's 5th district died. Binalbagan mayor Alejandro Mirasol beat Emilio Yulo III at the special election.

References

External links 
 Official website of the Commission on Elections
 Official website of National Movement for Free Elections (NAMFREL)
 Official website of the Parish Pastoral Council for Responsible Voting (PPCRV)

Results 
 Philippines 2010 Election Results – Main Site
 Philippines 2010 Election Results – Alternate Site
 PPCRV Map Viewer – PPCRV Encoded Site
 PPCRV Map Viewer – PPCRV Site
 NAMFREL – 2010 PARALLEL COUNT – NAMFREL Site
 HALALAN 2010: Latest Comelec official results – ABS-CBN Site
 ELEKSYON 2010: National Election Results Tally – GMA Site
 ELEKSYON 2010: Regional Election Results Tally – GMA Site
 The Vote 2010 Election Results Tally – Bombo Radyo Site

Media websites 
 Halalan 2010 – Election coverage by ABS-CBN
 Eleksyon 2010 – Election coverage by GMA Network
 Hatol ng Bayan (Auto-Vote 2010) – Election coverage by NBN-4, RPN-9 and IBC-13

2010 Philippine general election
2010